Siddhewadi is a village in Pandharpur tehsil, Maharashtra, India.

Demographics
The population is over 5,000. Siddhewadi has a lower literacy rate than Maharashtra. In 2011, the literacy rate was 77.78% compared to 82.34% in Maharashtra. The literacy rate among men is 87.12% and 68.45% among women.

Governance 
As per the constitution of India and Panchyati Raaj Act, Siddhewadi is administered by Sarpanch, the Head of Village, who was elected the representative of the village.

Education 
Jawaharlal Nehru Highschool
Zilla Parishad School up to 4 Standard

Economics and infrastructure 
The main water source is Manganga river and left uni canol.
The main crops are sugarcane, grape and pomegranate.  Other crops include  Jawar, maize, Bajri, Tur, peanut and wheat.

References

Villages in Solapur district